White Kittitians and Nevisians are people of Saint Kitts and Nevis of European descent. Approximately 2.2% of the population of Saint Kitts and Nevis is European as of 2001.

History 
The first Europeans to visit the islands were the Spanish. A substantial portion of the white population in Saint Kitts and Nevis claims descent from Irish and Scottish prisoners exiled to the islands during the rule of Oliver Cromwell. By 1805, 1,500 whites lived on the island of Saint Kitts and 1,300 lived on Nevis.

Notable people 

 William Skinner (1700–1780), Chief Royal Engineer
 Rawlins Lowndes (1721–1800), Governor of South Carolina
 Daniel Roberdeau (1727–1795), signatory of the Articles of Confederation
 Thomas Mathews (1742–1812), General of the American Revolutionary War
 Alexander Hamilton (1755–1804), Founding Father of the United States
 Frances Nelson (1758–1831), wife of Admiral Horatio Nelson
 Thomas Cottle (1761–1828), lawyer and planter
 Joseph Gerrald (1761–1828), political reformer
 Alfred Stephen (1802–1894), Chief Justice of New South Wales
 William Henry Smith (1826–1890), Member of the Nova Scotia House of Assembly
 Henry Spencer Berkeley (1851–1918), Attorney General of Fiji
 James Alfred Dunn Podd (1855–1886), Baptist preacher
 Arthur Anslyn MBE (1944–2017), marine expert
 George Astaphan (1946–2006), physician
 Cloey Uddenberg (born 2002), footballer
 Pavel Durov, entrepreneur, born in Russia

See also 
 French settlement in Saint Kitts and Nevis
 Irish immigration to Saint Kitts and Nevis

References 

Ethnic groups in Saint Kitts and Nevis
Saint Kitts and Nevis people of European descent